The Anvil Award is a Norwegian literary prize conferred by the association Friends of Olav H. Hauge. The prize consists of NOK 10,000 and an artistically crafted "anvil" created by the sculptor Leif Gjerme. The Anvil Award is conferred upon the person that has done the most to promote awareness of Hauge's poetry.

List of prizewinners

2000: Idar Stegane
2002: Ola E. Bø
2004: Jan Erik Vold	
2006: Erling Lægreid
2008: Robert Bly
2010: Arne Skjerven
2012: Bodil Cappelen
2014: Espen Eide
 2016: Klaus Anders
 2018: Ole Karlsen
 2021: Kathrine Hanson

References

External links
 Website of the Friends of Olav H. Hauge

Norwegian literary awards
Awards established in 2000
2000 establishments in Norway